Natalya Nikolayevna Uryadova (born March 15, 1977, in Moscow) is a female beach volleyball player from Russia. She claimed the gold medal at the 2006 European Championships in The Hague, Netherlands, partnering with Alexandra Shiryaeva. She also competed at the 2008 Summer Olympics.

Playing partners
Anna Bobrova
Alexandra Shiryaeva

References

External links
 
 

1977 births
Living people
Russian beach volleyball players
Olympic beach volleyball players of Russia
Beach volleyball players at the 2008 Summer Olympics
Women's beach volleyball players
Sportspeople from Moscow
20th-century Russian women
21st-century Russian women